Turridrupa erythraea is a species of sea snail, a marine gastropod mollusk in the family Turridae, the turrids.

Description
The length of the shell attains 40 mm.

Distribution
This species occurs in the Red Sea off Egypt and Saudi Arabia.

References

 Janssen, R.; Kantor, Yu. I. & Stahlschmidt, P. (2015). Identity and generic position of Pleurotoma erythraea Weinkauff 1875 from the Red Sea (Gastropoda: Conoidea: Turridae). Archiv für Molluskenkunde. 144(1): 99–104.

External links
 Weinkauff, H. C.; continued by Kobelt, W. (1875-1887). Die Familie Pleurotomidae. Systematisches Conchylien-Cabinet von Martini und Chemnitz. Vol. 4. Bauer & Raspe, Nürnberg, 248 pp., pls A, 1–42.
 Powell, A.W.B. (1964). The family Turridae in the Indo-Pacific. Part 1. The subfamily Turrinae. Indo-Pacific Mollusca. 1 (5): 227-346; 1 (7): 409-454

1875

erythraea